Illinois Central 201 is a steam locomotive, originally owned and operated by Illinois Central Railroad. The engine hauled thousands of passengers to the 1893 Columbian Exposition in Chicago, at which time, Casey Jones was one of its engineers. In 1949, the locomotive was operated at the Chicago Railroad Fair as part of the "Wheels A-Rolling" pageant.  It is now on static display at Illinois Railway Museum in Union, Illinois.

Service
201 was one of several 2-4-4T locomotives built for commuter service between the edge of the Chicago Loop and the South suburbs (now part of the Metra Electric District).

Preservation 
1401 was retired in 1926 when the IC electrified the route. The rest of the fleet retired in 1935 from yard service; some were sold to other railroads. in 1934, it was renumbered back into 201 where it took part at the Chicago Worlds Fair for many years until 1949. In 1975, the locomotive was sold to a private owner and displayed in front of the depot in Owatonna, Minnesota. It was donated to the Illinois Railway Museum in 2002.

References 

2-4-4T locomotives
201
Rogers locomotives
Individual locomotives of the United States
Preserved steam locomotives of Illinois
Standard gauge locomotives of the United States
Railway locomotives introduced in 1880